In cosmology, the equation of state of a perfect fluid is characterized by a dimensionless number , equal to the ratio of its pressure  to its energy density : 

It is closely related to the thermodynamic equation of state and ideal gas law.

The equation
The perfect gas equation of state may be written as 

Thus

FLRW equations and the equation of state
The equation of state may be used in Friedmann–Lemaître–Robertson–Walker (FLRW) equations to describe the evolution of an isotropic universe filled with a perfect fluid. If  is the scale factor then 

If the fluid is the dominant form of matter in a flat universe, then

where  is the proper time.

In general the Friedmann acceleration equation is

If we define (what might be called "effective") energy density and pressure as

and 
the acceleration equation may be written as

Non-relativistic particles
In an expanding universe, the total energy of non-relativistic matter remains constant, with its density decreasing as the volume increases.

Ultra-relativistic particles
In an expanding universe, the energy density of radiation decreases more quickly than the volume expansion, because its wavelength is red-shifted.

Acceleration of cosmic inflation
Cosmic inflation and the  accelerated expansion of the universe can be characterized by the equation of state of dark energy. More generally, the expansion of the universe is accelerating for any equation of state . The accelerated expansion of the Universe was indeed observed. According to observations, the value of equation of state of cosmological constant is near -1.

Hypothetical phantom energy would have an equation of state , and would cause a Big Rip. Using the existing data, it is still impossible to distinguish between phantom  and non-phantom .

Fluids
In an expanding universe, fluids with larger equations of state disappear more quickly than those with smaller equations of state. This is the origin of the flatness and monopole problems of the Big Bang: curvature has  and monopoles have , so if they were around at the time of the early Big Bang, they should still be visible today. These problems are solved by cosmic inflation which has . Measuring the equation of state of dark energy is one of the largest efforts of observational cosmology.

Scalar modeling
A scalar field  can be viewed as a sort of perfect fluid with equation of state

A free scalar field has , and one with vanishing kinetic energy is equivalent to a cosmological constant: . Any equation of state in between, but not crossing the  barrier known as the Phantom Divide Line (PDL), is achievable, which makes scalar fields useful models for many phenomena in cosmology.

Notes

Physical cosmology
Equations of state